
Guess Who's Not Coming to Dinner may refer to:

Television 

 "Guess Who's Not Coming to Dinner?", an episode of the Australian sitcom Hey Dad..!
 "Guess Who's Not Coming to Dinner?", an episode of the American drama The Secret Life of the American Teenager
 "Guess Who's Not Coming to Dinner?", an episode of the British drama Table 12, starring Edward Olive, Ben Price, Gwen Taylor, and Marsha Thomason

American live-action sitcom 

 "Guess Who's Not Coming to Dinner" (Will & Grace), an episode of Will & Grace
 "Guess Who's Not Coming to Dinner" (Yes, Dear), an episode of Yes, Dear
 "Guess Who's Not Coming to Dinner?", an episode of The New Adventures of Old Christine
 "Guess Who's Not Coming to Dinner?", an episode of The Jeffersons
 "Guess Who's Not Coming to Dinner?", an episode of The Steve Harvey Show
 "Guess Who's Not Coming to Dinner", an episode of Living Dolls
 "Guess Who's Not Coming to Dinner?", an episode of The Jamie Foxx Show
 "Guess Who's Not Coming to Dinner?", an episode of an American version of Holding the Baby, starring Jon Patrick Walker, Jennifer Westfeldt, and Eddie McClintock
 "Guess Who's Not Coming to Dinner?", an episode of Headmaster, starring Andy Griffith

See also 
 Guess Who's Coming to Dinner (disambiguation)
 Guess Who's Coming to Breakfast (disambiguation)
 Guess Who's Coming to Lunch (disambiguation)
 Guess Who's Coming to Visit (disambiguation)
 "Guess Who's Knott Coming to Dinner?", an episode of the hour-long animated series The New Scooby-Doo Movies